The Alma Mater Society of Queen's University, otherwise known as the AMS, is the central undergraduate student association at Queen's University at Kingston in Kingston, Ontario, Canada. It is the oldest organization of its kind in Canada. Its roots lie in the old Dialectic Society (now known as the Queen's Debating Union), which created the AMS in 1858. The society seeks to represent and facilitate the student experience, whether it is through a multitude of clubs, services, governance or volunteer opportunities.

An umbrella organization, the AMS each year hires over 500 student employees and 1500 volunteers, as it works with member faculty societies to offer resources, services, support, and opportunities to Queen's students.

Structure and organization

AMS Assembly
The Society's ultimate authority lies with the AMS Assembly, which is composed of elected representatives from each of the nine member faculty societies (Arts and Science, Engineering and Applied Science, Concurrent Education, M.B.A., Commerce, Nursing, Medicine, Physical and Health Education, and Computing),  Health Sciences Society as well as non-voting representatives of the Residence Society. Other Ex-Officio members that sit on assembly include the AMS Commissioners, the University Rector, Undergraduate Trustee, Board of Directors Chair, and the AMS Secretariat.

The Assembly is the premier student democratic body of both the Society and the University. It holds bi-annual referendums and annual elections to affirm representatives, approve or change student fees, and even gather student approval for different initiatives and plans. The referendums and elections are bolstered by an Annual General Meeting or AGM, typically held in March, which contains a broad agenda of student issues and opens voting to any current students in attendance. Assembly is managed by the AMS Secretary.

AMS Executive
The three-person AMS Executive oversee the student society's general operations and representation. The executive is elected annually in January as a slate with the positions of AMS President, Vice-President (Operations) & CEO, and Vice-President (University Affairs). Responsibilities are generally divided along the lines of the corporate and government sides of the AMS, with the VP University Affairs overseeing the five commissions and two of the three Government Offices, the VP Operations managing three student directors and their many corporate services, and the President responsible for managing four Offices, representing the Society and liaising with the administration. The executive is elected for a one-year term of service lasting from May 1 to April 30.

AMS Executive Team
The day-to-day operations of the AMS are overseen by the AMS Executive Team (formerly known as the "AMS Council") which includes the three-person AMS Executive, four commissioners, one government director, four services directors, and four office directors. The Executive Team is responsible for the operational implementation of AMS objectives from year to year, with major decisions being made in regard to service operation, stances on advocacy and causes (including representation to the provincial government through OUSA), and general management of their portfolios.

Commissions
The five Commissioners on the Executive Team each oversee their own Commission, which form the bulk of the "government side" of the AMS government. The Commissions are responsible for the organization and oversight of a variety of student programs, activities, community initiatives, external representation, and social causes. As of the 2017/2018 academic year, the Commissions are: (1) External Affairs, (2) Campus Activities, (3) Environmental Sustainability, (4) Clubs, and (5) Social Issues.

After the Commission of Environmental Sustainability was dissolved in 2016–17, it was brought back in 2020-21 by the executive.

Offices
Five Offices exist, five of which report to the AMS President. Four of these offices are overseen by the Directors of:

 Human Resources
 Communications
 Marketing
 The Student Life Centre

In addition, as of the 2017/2018 academic year, the Office of the Secretariat also falls under the President's portfolio; the Secretary oversees elections and referendums, as well as the administrative functioning of the AMS Assembly. With the change, Judicial Affairs now fall under the Office. Led by the Judicial Affairs Manager, is one half of the AMS's peer-administered system of restorative, non-academic discipline. (The other half, the Judicial Committee, shares resources with the Office of the Secretariat, but is otherwise constitutionally separated from any Office or Commission in order to ensure independence.)

Services
The Vice President (Operations) manages the AMS' Services. This includes:

 Common Ground Coffeehouse
 Queen's Student Constables (QSC or "StuCons")
 Printing & Copy Centre (P&CC)
 Tricolour Outlet (formerly Destinations and The AMS Merchandise Services, operating The Used Bookstore & Tricolour Outfitters)
 Peer Support Centre
 Queen's Journal
 Walkhome
 Studio Q (combining the former Queen's TV and Yearbook & Design Services)
 Formerly TAPS (Queen's Pub, The Underground)

Permanent Staff

Due to the yearly turnover of the executive and senior management, there are permanent staff members to help with the longevity of the society. The permanent staff positions include (but not limited to):

 General Manager
 Controller
 Payroll Administration
 Facilities Officer
 Human Resources Officer
 Information Officer
 Operations Officer

History
The AMS was formed as an offshoot of the Dialectic Society, the precursor to the Queen's Debating Union. It split off to form an independent organization in 1858.

The AMS has banned its members from joining externally-affiliated fraternities and sororities since 1933. While fraternities do exist in the Kingston area, the restriction prevents them from recruiting on-campus or affiliating themselves with the University.

The AMS was incorporated in 1969 as a non-profit organization without share capital; the Assembly representatives also serve as the voting members of the corporation, and they annually elect a Board of Directors that oversees the services and financial affairs of the Society. These affairs currently have an annual operations budget of approximately $20 million.

At its inception, the AMS represented all students attending Queen's University. However, that changed in 1981 when the Graduate Students' Society (GSS), an AMS member society formed in 1962, voted by referendum to secede from the AMS. This secession developed out of a conflict around graduate student representation, student services, policy positions, and other issues. In the 1990s, the AMS saw the Theological Society and the Law Students' Society also leave the AMS - the latter over a dispute regarding student constables - to join the GSS. Through an amendment to its constitution and by-laws, the GSS was renamed the Queen's University Society of Graduate and Professional Students, in order to recognize the membership of professional students, including law, divinity, and occupational health students.

In January 2009, the Education Students Society (ESS) voted to leave the AMS, primarily over a debate regarding fees.

Representation
The AMS currently represents approximately 18,000 students, each of whom becomes a member of the Society upon paying the mandatory student activity fee along with their tuition. Membership in the AMS is mandatory for those in full-time study in one of the AMS-constituent faculties. The AMS represents undergraduate and full-time MBA students.

Today, the AMS seeks to enhance both the academic and extracurricular experience of its members while fostering connections with the surrounding community.

Provincially, the AMS is a founding member of the Ontario Undergraduate Student Alliance (OUSA), and thus initially became a member at its foundation 1992; however, the AMS left the organization in 1995. In 2004, the AMS rejoined OUSA as full members, after a number of years as associate observers.

Federally, the AMS joined the Canadian Alliance of Student Associations (CASA) in 2009 on a one-year associate membership basis. The one-year associate member status expired without renewal in 2010. In 2015, the AMS joined several other student associations from U15 Group of Canadian Research Universities schools in forming the Undergraduates of Canadian Research Intensive Universities.

See also
 The Queen's Journal
 CFRC
 Ontario Undergraduate Student Alliance
 Canadian Alliance of Student Associations
 List of Ontario students' associations

References

External links
 
 Queen's University official site

Ontario students' associations
Queen's University at Kingston
Organizations based in Kingston, Ontario